The environment of Albania is characterised by unique flora and fauna and a variety of landforms contained within a small nation. It also consists of different ecoregions, which represent the natural geographical ecosystem, water systems, weather, renewable resources and influences upon them.

Of the factors caused by human intervention that can affect this environment, activities that sustain the economy of Albania such as mining and forestry are notably influential. The environment strongly influences public health in Albania, as for example air pollution and smog in urban areas such as in Tirana can result in great distress for those with respiratory conditions such as asthma.

Geography 

Albania is a small predominantly mountainous country between Southeastern and Southern Europe, on facing the Adriatic and [[Ionian
n Sea|Ionian sea]]s within the Mediterranean Sea.

Climate 

With Albania's coastline facing the Adriatic and Ionian seas, its highlands backed upon the elevated Balkan landmass, and the entire country lying at a latitude subject to a variety of weather patterns during the winter and summer seasons, Albania has a high number of climatic regions for such a small area. The coastal lowlands have typically mediterranean climate; the highlands have a continental climate. In both the lowlands and the interior, the weather varies markedly from north to south.

Inland temperatures are affected more by differences in elevation than by latitude or any other factor. Low winter temperatures in the mountains are caused by the continental air mass that dominates the weather in Eastern Europe and the Balkans. Northerly and northeasterly winds blow much of the time. Average summer temperatures are lower than in the coastal areas and much lower at higher elevations, but daily fluctuations are greater. Daytime maximum temperatures in the interior basins and river valleys are very high, but the nights are almost always cool.

Biodiversity 
 

Phytogeographically, Albania is part of the Boreal Kingdom specifically, part of the Illyrian province of the Circumboreal Region and Mediterranean region within the Boreal kingdom. Albania is divided into three ecoregions including Illyrian deciduous forests, Dinaric mixed forests, Balkan mixed forests and Pindus mixed forests. Further, Biomes in Albania include Temperate broadleaf and mixed forest and Mediterranean forests, woodlands, and scrub, that are all in the Palearctic realm. Due to its climatic, hydrological, geological and topographical conditions, Albania is one of the richest in Europe in terms of biodiversity. Almost 30% of the entire flora and 42% fauna in the entire European continent can be found in Albania.

These include 15 national parks, 5 protected landscape areas, 29 nature reserves, 4 protected resource areas and 750 nature monuments. Other large national parks includes the Butrint National Park, Karaburun-Sazan National Marine Park, Divjaka-Karavasta National Park, Prespa National Park, Shebenik-Jabllanice National Park, and others.

See also 
 Environmental issues in Albania
 Geography of Albania
 Climate of Albania
 Biodiversity of Albania

References